Newton–Cartan theory (or geometrized Newtonian gravitation) is a geometrical re-formulation, as well as a generalization, of Newtonian gravity first introduced by Élie Cartan and Kurt Friedrichs and later developed by Dautcourt, Dixon, Dombrowski and Horneffer, Ehlers, Havas, Künzle, Lottermoser, Trautman, and others. In this re-formulation, the structural similarities between Newton's theory and Albert Einstein's general theory of relativity are readily seen, and it has been used by Cartan and Friedrichs to give a rigorous formulation of the way in which Newtonian gravity can be seen as a specific limit of general relativity, and by Jürgen Ehlers to extend this correspondence to specific solutions of general relativity.

Classical spacetimes
In Newton–Cartan theory, one starts with a smooth four-dimensional manifold  and defines two (degenerate) metrics. One also requires that these two metrics satisfy a transversality (or "orthogonality") condition, . One might say that a classical spacetime is the analog of a relativistic spacetime , where  is a smooth Lorentzian metric on the manifold .

Geometric formulation of Poisson's equation
In Newton's theory of gravitation, Poisson's equation reads

The weak equivalence principle motivates a geometric version of the equation of motion for a point particle in the potential 

where  is the inertial mass and  the gravitational mass. Since, according to the weak equivalence principle , the according equation of motion

does not contain anymore a reference to the mass of the particle. Following the idea that the solution of the equation then is a property of the curvature of space, a connection is constructed so that the geodesic equation

represents the equation of motion of a point particle in the potential . The resulting connection is

The Riemann curvature tensor in inertial system coordinates of this connection is then given by

where the brackets  mean the antisymmetric combination of the tensor . The Ricci tensor is given by

which leads to following geometric formulation of Poisson's equation

More explicitly, if the roman indices i and j range over the spatial coordinates 1, 2, 3, then the connection is given by

the Riemann curvature tensor by

and the Ricci tensor and Ricci scalar by

where all components not listed equal zero.

Note that this formulation does not require introducing the concept of a metric: the connection alone gives all the physical information.

Bargmann lift
It was shown that four-dimensional Newton–Cartan theory of gravitation can be reformulated as Kaluza–Klein reduction of five-dimensional Einstein gravity along a null-like direction. This lifting is considered to be useful for non-relativistic holographic models.

References

Bibliography

 (English translation of Ann. Sci. Éc. Norm. Supér. #40 paper)
Chapter 1 of 

Theories of gravity